Events from the year 1466 in France

Incumbents
 Monarch – Louis XI

Events
 Louis XI introduces silk weaving to Lyon

Deaths
 24 April - Margaret, Countess of Vertus, widow of the Duke of Brittany (born 1406)

References

1460s in France